This list of mines in Algeria is subsidiary to the list of mines article and lists working, defunct and future mines in the country and is organised by the primary mineral output. For practical purposes stone, marble and other quarries may be included in this list.

Feldspar mines
Aïn Barbar mine

Iron mines
Gâra Djebilet mine

Lead and zinc mines
Tala Hamza mine

Phosphate Mines
Betita mine
Bled El Hadba mine
Djebel Onk mine
Djemi Djema mine
Kef Snoun mine

References

Mines
Algeria
 
Mines